The name Lillian has been used for two tropical cyclones in the Eastern Pacific Ocean.

 Tropical Storm Lillian (1963) – made landfall on Western Mexico.
 Hurricane Lillian (1973) – remained over the open ocean.

Pacific hurricane set index articles